The prominent knobs of bone at the costochondral joints of rickets patients are known as a rachitic rosary or beading of the ribs. The knobs create the appearance of large beads under the skin of the rib cage, hence the name by analogy with the beads of a Catholic Christian rosary.

Causes
Causes include:
 Rickets : Nodularity at costochondral junction (rachitic rosary).
 Scurvy : More angular costochondral junction with a sharper step-off (scorbutic rosary) and depressed sternum.
 Chondrodystrophy

Pathophysiology 
Rachitic rosary is due to a deficiency of calcium resulting in lack of mineralization and an overgrowth of costochondral joint cartilage. The calcium deficiency may be caused by rickets or other causes of calcium deficiency such as hypoparathyroidism.

Diagnosis 
Palpation ( Beads formation) , on chest X-ray

Management
Will be present throughout the life (rickets should be treated first)

References

Pediatrics
Skeletal disorders
Malnutrition
Symptoms and signs: musculoskeletal system